This is a comprehensive list of awards, honours and other recognitions bestowed on Nelson Mandela. Mandela received more than 260 awards over 40 years, most notably the Nobel Peace Prize in 1993.

From 1994 to 1999, Mandela was President of South Africa. He was the first such African to be elected in fully representative democratic polls.

Before his presidency, Mandela was an anti-apartheid activist and leader of the African National Congress and its armed wing Umkhonto we Sizwe. He spent 27 years in prison, much of it in a cell on Robben Island. The rest of his incarceration was in Pollsmoor Prison, on convictions for crimes that included sabotage committed while he spearheaded the struggle against apartheid.

Following his release from prison on 11 February 1990, his advocacy of a policy of reconciliation and negotiation helped lead the transition to multi-racial democracy in South Africa. Since the end of apartheid, he was widely praised, even by former opponents.

Mandela died on 5 December 2013, a celebrated elder statesman who continued to voice his opinion on topical issues. In South Africa he is often known as Madiba, an aristocratic title adopted by the elderly members of the royal clan that he belongs to. This title has come to be synonymous with Nelson Mandela.

1960s
 1964 – Elected Honorary President of the Students' Union, University of Leeds Tyler Hopper

1970s
 1973 – A nuclear particle discovered by scientists at the University of Leeds is named the "Mandela particle".
 1975 – Honorary life membership of the Students' Union, University of London
 1979 – Awarded Honorary Doctorate of Law, University of Lesotho, Maseru, 29 September
 1979 – Jawaharlal Nehru Award for International Understanding, by the Indian Council for Cultural Relations New Delhi, India

1981
 August –  Freedom of the City of Glasgow
 The first UK road named in his honor – "Mandela Close" – is unveiled in the London Borough of Brent
 Bruno Kreisky Award for merit in the field of human rights, chosen by a panel of international judges, Vienna, Austria

1983
 Honorary citizenship of Rome, February
 Honorary citizenship of Olympia, Greece, 17 March
 Honorary Doctorate of Laws, City College of New York, 22 March
 Ornamental gardens in Hull, United Kingdom, named "Nelson Mandela Gardens", May
 City Council of Dublin, Ireland, unveiled sculpture in Merrion Square by Elisabeth Frink dedicated to Nelson Mandela, 26 June
 Award of the order Star of International Friendship in gold by the German Democratic Republic, 18 July
 City Council of Harlow, United Kingdom, renamed one of its major roads in honour of Nelson Mandela, 18 July
 AUEW/TASS, one of United Kingdom's major trade unions, renamed their executive committee room the "Nelson Mandela Room", 18 July
 Freedom of London Borough of Greenwich, 20 July
 UNESCO awards its first Simon Bolivar International Prize jointly to Nelson Mandela and King Juan Carlos of Spain at a ceremony in Caracas, Venezuela, on the 200th anniversary of the birth of Simón Bolívar, 24 July
 City Council of Leeds, United Kingdom, names the Civic Hall "Nelson Mandela Gardens", 10 December
 Honorary Doctorate of Laws, Lancaster University, United Kingdom
 The Students Unions of Warwick University, Coventry Polytechnic (now Coventry University) and South Bank Polytechnic (now London South Bank University) named rooms in honour of Nelson Mandela
 New York City renamed square in front of South African mission to the United Nations 'Nelson and Winnie Mandela Plaza'

1984
 Honorary Degree, Free University of Brussels, 13 January
 London Borough of Camden Council, names the street where the Anti-Apartheid Movement has its headquarters as "Mandela Street".
 London Borough of Hackney Council, renames a housing block after Nelson Mandela, April
 Order of Playa Girón, Cuba, awarded by Fidel Castro
 Honorary membership of National Association of Local Government Officers [NALGO] United Kingdom
 London Borough of Haringey Council, names housing development after Nelson Mandela
 Monument to Nelson Mandela unveiled in Merrion Square, Dublin
 Elected Honorary Member of the Students Association, University of Strathclyde, Scotland
 Freedom of the City of Wijnegem, Belgium
 Awarded Star of International Friendship, German Democratic Republic, 27 August
 Freedom of the City of Aberdeen conferred on both Nelson and Winnie Mandela, 29 November
 School in German Democratic Republic named 'Nelson Mandela School'
 Room at Edinburgh city chambers named in his honour

1985
 Revenue Staff Federation, United Kingdom, names its Commonwealth trade union scholarship after Nelson Mandela
 London Borough of Southwark names new road 'Mandela Way'
 Nottingham City Council names a room in a sports centre
 The Third World Prize, awarded annually by the London-based Third World Foundation for Social and Economic Studies, awarded jointly to Nelson and Winnie Mandela
 Awarded freedom of the City of Hull, United Kingdom.
 Awarded Degree of Doctor of Laws by the University of Strathclyde, Glasgow, 3 July 1985
 Freeman of Midlothian, Scotland (accepted during his October 1993 visit)
 Awarded the Ludovic-Trarieux International Human Rights Prize by Human Rights Institute of The Bar of Bordeaux, Bordeaux, France, 29 March
 Nigerian writers organisation, Writers and Journalists Against Apartheid (WAJAAP), confers title of Life Patron
 Town of Huddersfield in West Yorkshire, United Kingdom, renames its speakers' corner Nelson Mandela Corner, September
 Freedom of the City of Rio de Janeiro, Brazil, October
 Honorary citizenship of the State of Rio de Janeiro, Brazil, October
 Diploma of Honour and Friendship from the University of Rio de Janeiro, Brazil, October
 Statue of Nelson Mandela erected in London by Greater London Council, unveiled by Oliver Tambo on 28 October
 Senegal's President Abdou Diouf inaugurates Soweto Square and Nelson Mandela Avenue in the centre of Dakar, Senegal, 6 December
 Awarded Doctor of Laws degree by Ahmadu Bello University in Nigeria, December

1986

 Elected Honorary Life President of the National Union of Mineworkers of South Africa
 Awarded the W.E.B. DuBois International Medal by the National Association for the Advancement of Colored People (NAACP)
 Coventry City Council named new building after Mandela
 Presented with the Alfonso Comin Foundation Peace Award in Barcelona, Spain
 Freedom of the Borough of Islwyn, Wales, given to Winnie and Nelson Mandela
 International Peace and Freedom Award by the Workers International Centre, Stockholm Sweden
 Honorary Doctor of Literature, University of Calcutta
 Awarded, with Winnie Mandela, the Third World Prize by the Strategic and International Studies Group of Malaysia, 5 May
 Honorary Doctorate of Laws, University of Zimbabwe
 Nelson Mandela Park in Leicester, England, named after Mandela
 Honorary membership awarded to Winnie and Nelson Mandela by the National Union of Seamen, United Kingdom
 St George's Place in Glasgow, Scotland, the location of the South African consulate is renamed Nelson Mandela Place.
 Awarded the Cross of St. Andrew by Scotland.
 Made Honorary Freeman of Newcastle

1987
 First person to receive the Freedom of the City of Sydney, Australia, 9 January.
 Honorary Degrees, Winnie and Nelson Mandela, United States Ross University School of Medicine in the Caribbean
 Named Patron of Isipingo and District Football Association, Natal
 Honorary Degree, University of Michigan, USA
 Honorary Degree. University of Havana, Cuba
 Honorary Citizen, City of Florence, Italy
 Honorary Doctor of Laws, Trent University, Canada
 Honorary Doctorate, Karl Marx University of the German Democratic Republic, Leipzig, 11 November
 Archivo Disarmo Golden Doves for Peace International Award
 Dutch football player Ruud Gullit dedicates his European Footballer of the Year award to Nelson Mandela

1988
 Park in Montreal named "Parc Winnie-et-Nelson-Mandela" (Winnie's name removed in 1998)
 Awarded Bremen Solidarity Prize, Federal Republic of Germany
 Nelson and Winnie Mandela given honorary membership of the National Union of Teachers, United Kingdom
 Awarded freedom of the City of Dublin, Ireland
 Awarded the Sakharov Prize for Freedom of Thought, by the European Parliament
 Honorary Doctorate conferred, University of Carabobo, Venezuela, June
 Awarded honorary degree from Western Michigan University from then-president Diether Haenicke, June
 People of Lefkada, Greece, award the Medal of Peace, August
 Honorary citizenship conferred by nine Greek municipalities Egaleo, Ellenikon, Glyfada, Ilioupolis, Daissariani, New Filadelfia, Nikaea, Preveza and Zogrofu
 Honorary degree in Political Science awarded by the University of Bologna, Italy, 12 September
 Honorary citizenship bestowed by the Town Council of the city of Bologna, Italy, September
 Awarded the United Nations Human Rights Fourth Award, 10 December
 Nelson Mandela Road named, New Delhi, India, 10 December
 Bachelor of Laws degree, University of South Africa

1989
 Augusto César Sandino Award bestowed by Daniel Ortega, President of Nicaragua, Managua, 21 February
 Freedom of the Municipality of Kwekwe, Zimbabwe. Award received on his behalf by Oliver Tambo
 Awarded Peace Prize of the Tipperary Peace Committee, Ireland
 Nuremberg Platz renamed "Nelson Mandela Platz", Nuremberg, Germany, June
 Honorary Doctorate of Laws, York University, Toronto, Ontario, Canada, 16 June
 Square in Clayes-sous-Bois, France, named "Nelson Mandela Square", September

1990

 Made Honorary Life President of National Union of Mineworkers when he addressed its Central Committee, 21 April
 Granted freedom of the City of Harare, Zimbabwe, March
 "Mandela Day", a public holiday declared in Zimbabwe on 5 March
 Awarded the Lenin Peace Prize for 1990, May.  The last-ever recipient.
 Bestowed the Dr António Agostinho Neto Order, the highest honour of the People's Republic of Angola, 12 May
 Bestowed the award "Grand Commander of the Federal Republic of Nigeria", Lagos, 14 May
 Awarded the Al-Gaddafi International Prize for Human Rights in Tripoli, Libya, 19 or 20 May
 Honorary degree in political science by the Cairo University, Egypt, May
 Bestowed Bharat Ratna, India's highest civilian award, October
 Doctorate, honoris causa, conferred by University of Malaya, November
 Honorary Doctorate in law, University of the Western Cape, Bellville, Cape Town, 28 November
 Honorary Doctor of Laws, University of Cape Town

1991
 Honorary LL.D Degree conferred, University of the Witwatersrand, Johannesburg, 6 September
 Awarded Carter-Menil Human Rights Prize, 8 December
 Awarded Félix Houphouët-Boigny Peace Prize by UNESCO
 Honorary Doctorate of Humane Letters from Texas Southern University in 1991.
 Honorary Doctor of Laws, The University of the West Indies, Jamaica, July

1992
 Installed as Chancellor of the University of the North (now called University of Limpopo), 25 April
 Honorary LL.D Degree conferred by the University of Fort Hare, 9 May
 Honorary Doctorate conferred at the Cheikh Anta Diop University of Dakar, Senegal, 30 June
 Presented with the Freedom of Miami Beach Medallion of Honour, Johannesburg, 29 September
 Pakistan conferred the Nishan-e-Pakistan, 3 October
 Prince of Asturias Award for International Cooperation, Oviedo, Spain, 31 October
 Received the "Spirit of Liberty" award at the "People for the American Way" award ceremony, 8 November
 Received the Isitwalandwe Medal from the ANC.
 Awarded the Atatürk International Peace Prize by Turkey, but refused the award citing human rights violations committed by Turkey during that time, which was the denial of the existing of more than 20 million Kurds in Turkey

1993

 Received Gleitsman Foundation International Activist Award, Johannesburg, 12 May
 Received Philadelphia Liberty Medal. Presented by President of the United States Bill Clinton, Philadelphia, USA, 4 July
 Honorary Degree conferred, Clark Atlanta University, 10 July
 Received Order of Brilliant Star with Special Grand Cordon, Taipei, Taiwan, 31 July
 Honorary Doctorate of Laws, Soochow University, Taiwan, 1 August
 Received Apostolic Humanitarian Award, Johannesburg, 15 September
 Awarded J. William Fulbright Prize for International Understanding, Washington, DC, 1 October
 Received Honorary Degree from the Free University of Brussels, Belgium, 8 October
 Awarded Nobel Peace Prize Oslo, Norway, 10 December
 Named Person of the Year by Time magazine, together with F. W. de Klerk, Yasser Arafat and Yitzhak Rabin.

1994
 Received the New Nation/Engen Man of the Year Flame of Distinction award, 24 March
 Elected Newsmaker of the Year, with Deputy President F W de Klerk, by the Johannesburg Press Club, 25 May. Prof Kader Asmal received the award on 29 September
 Received the Hunger Project's 8th annual Africa Prize for Leadership for the Sustainable End of Hunger, London, 19 July
 Received Anne Frank medal for human rights and tolerance, Johannesburg, 15 August
 Received Sheikh Yusuf Peace Award from the Muslim Women's Federation, 10 September
 Received the Arthur A Houghton Star Crystal Award for Excellence from the African-American Institute, 6 October
 Received Bishop John T. Walker Distinguished Humanitarian Service Award from Africare, 6 October
 Honorary Doctorate, Howard University, 7 October
 Received freedom of the town of Tongaat, KwaZulu-Natal, 21 October (initially granted in 1989)
 Received the Olympic Gold Order from International Olympic Committee president, Juan Antonio Samaranch, Cape Town, 16 November
 Received Man of the Year Award from the Greek Chamber of Commerce and Industries of Southern Africa, Johannesburg, 19 November 1994
 Received the Grand'Croix degree of the National Order of the Legion of Honour of France, Paris, 28 December
 Honorary Doctorate awarded by University of South Africa
 Awarded the "Commonwealth Champion of Health" medal, received by South African athletes at the Commonwealth Games, Canada

1995
 Africa Peace Award – sponsored jointly by the African Centre for the Constructive Resolution of Disputes (ACCORD) and the Organisation of African Unity (OAU) – presented at a ceremony in Durban, March
 Appointed an honorary member of the Order of Merit by Queen Elizabeth II
 "Nelson Mandela Road" to Katse, Lesotho, inaugurated, 13 July
 Received Pretoria Press Club's 1994 Newsmaker of the Year Award, Pretoria, 20 July
 Granted the Freedom of Uitenhage, 14 September
 Awarded Honorary Fellowship of the College of Medicine of South Africa, Johannesburg, 17 October
 Harvard Business School Statesman of the Year Award, 14 December
 Human Rights Institute, with President Mandela as honorary chairman, launched in London by the International Bar Association, December 1995
 The Wolf Award, presented in South Africa by Canadian aboriginal leaders Phil Fontaine and George Muswagon

1996
 Awarded honorary fellowship of the Royal College of Surgeons in Ireland, Dublin, Ireland
 Indira Gandhi Award for International Justice and Harmony bestowed. Award received by Justice Minister Dullah Omar in New Delhi, India, January
 Received the World Citizenship Award of the World Association of Girl Guides and Girl Scouts
 U Thant Peace Award bestowed by Sri Chinmoy, 29 January
 Created Knight of the Order of the Elephant by the Danish Queen Margrethe II, Copenhagen, 18 February. By tradition of the order, the Knight's coat of arms is drawn on a plate and it is hung in the chapel of Frederiksborg Castle. If one hasn't a coat of arms (as was the case for Mandela), the Court heraldist composes one, with the Knight's cooperation. Mandela eventually chose the South African flag as his coat of arms to be used for this and other foreign orders. The elephant insignia that he received had previously been worn by Emperor Haile Selassie of Ethiopia.
 Awarded the National Order of Mali (Grande Croix), Mali's highest decoration, Bamako, 3 March
 Received the Freedom of the City of London, London, 10 July
 Received the Degree of Doctor of Civil Law by Diploma of the University of Oxford and honorary degrees from the Universities of Cambridge (LLD), London (London School of Economics), Bristol, Nottingham, and Warwick (LLD) and from De Montfort and Glasgow Caledonian Universities in the garden of Buckingham Palace, 10 July A photograph of the event is available on the Glasgow Caledonian University Archives website
 Received Honorary Doctorate from Pantheon-Sorbonne University, Paris, 15 July
 Received Honorary Doctorate from Stellenbosch University, 25 October
 Received the Freedom of Heidelberg, Heidelberg, 29 November
 Awarded The Battle of Adwa and the Victory of Adwa Centenary Medal by the Crown Council of Ethiopia in 1996

1997

 Mandela Family Museum opens in Soweto, 29 November
 Awarded Honorary Degree by the University of the Philippines Diliman, Quezon City, 2 March
 Created Knight of the Royal Order of the Seraphim, Stockholm, 3 February. By tradition of the order, the Knight's coat of arms is drawn on a plate and it is kept in the Hall of the Order of the Seraphim at the Royal Palace of Stockholm. If one hasn't a coat of arms, the Court heraldist composes one, with the Knight's cooperation. In this case, the Danish coat of arms was used as a starting point. By tradition, on the day of his funeral (15 December 2013), it was hung in Riddarholmen Church and the church bells rang constantly from 12:00 to 13:00 as a tribute.
 Received Freedom of the City of Pietermaritzburg, 25 April
 Received Freedom of the City of Bloemfontein, 16 May
 Baker Avenue in Central Harare, Zimbabwe, Renamed Nelson Mandela Avenue, 19 May
 Received Freedom of Boksburg, 26 June
 Received Freedom of Oxford, United Kingdom, 11 July
 Awarded Honorary Doctorate from Chulalongkorn University, Bangkok, Thailand, 17 July
 Awarded Honorary Doctorate by Ben-Gurion University of the Negev, Cape Town, 19 September
 Received the American Public Health Association Presidential Citation, Pretoria, 14 October
 Awarded the Collar of the Nile by President Hosni Mubarak of Egypt, Cairo, 21 October
 Received Freedom of City of Edinburgh, Scotland, 27 October
 Received Freedom of City of Cape Town, 27 November
 Received Honorary Degree from the University of Pretoria, Pretoria, 4 December
 Multi-purpose room at Binghamton University renamed Nelson Mandela's Room
 The National Stadium in Kampala, Uganda is named Mandela National Stadium, opened in 1997 with a concert by Lucky Dube.

1998
 Received Honorary Doctoral Degree from the University of South Australia, University of Fort Hare, 23 April
 Awarded Honorary Doctorate, University of Zululand, 30 May
 Awarded the Freedom of the City and County of Cardiff, Cardiff, 16 June
 Awarded the Chris Hani Award at the 10th National Congress of the South African Communist Party, Johannesburg, 1 July
 Awarded Honorary Degree by the University of Mauritius, 11 September
 Park in Montreal named again "Parc Nelson-Mandela", 14 September
 Awarded Honorary Doctorate by Harvard University, Cambridge, Massachusetts, 18 September
 Awarded Congressional Gold Medal, Washington, 23 September
 Appointed Honorary Companion of the Order of Canada by the Governor General of Canada on behalf of the Queen of Canada, 24 September.
 Nelson Mandela public school named in his honour in Toronto.
 Presented with Award in Recognition of his Contribution to Democracy, Human Rights and Freedom by the Supreme Council of Sport in Africa, 19 November
 Created a Knight Grand Cross of the Royal Norwegian Order of St Olav by the King of Norway.

1999
 Received the Deutscher Medienpreis, Baden-Baden, Germany, 28 January
 Awarded the Oneness-Peace Earth-Summit-Transcendence-Fragrance Award, Pretoria, 9 March
 Received the Golden Medal of the City of Amsterdam, Netherlands, 10 March
 Received honorary doctorate from Leiden University, Netherlands, 12 March
 Awarded the Freedom of the City of Durban, Durban, 16 April
 Received Honorary Doctorate from the Russian Academy of Sciences, Moscow, 30 April
 Received Ukraine's Highest Decoration, the First Class of the Order of Prince Yaroslav the Wise, Cape Town, 5 May
 Received Jesse Owens Global Award, Johannesburg, 21 September
 Received insignia of Honour from the African Renaissance Institute, Johannesburg, 11 October
 Received an Honorary Doctorate of Laws from the University of Botswana, Gaborone, 14 October
 Received the Baker Institute Enron Prize for Distinguished Public Service at Rice University, Houston, 26 October
 Awarded the Freedom of the City of Lydenburg, Lydenburg, 3 November
 Appointed Honorary Companion of the Order of Australia, Canberra, 9 June; presented with the insignia by Australian Prime Minister John Howard in Pretoria on 15 November.
 Was among 18 included in Gallup's List of Widely Admired People of the 20th Century, from a poll conducted of the American people in December 1999.
 Presented with Temple of Understanding Annual Award to Religious and Political Leaders for Outstanding Service to Humanity, Cape Town, 5 December
 Presented with the Gandhi-King Award by the World Movement for Nonviolence at the World Parliament of Religions, Cape Town, 5 December
 Listed as one of the 100 most influential people of the 20th century by Time magazine
 Created Knight of the Dutch/Luxembourgian Order of the Gold Lion of the House of Nassau, Netherlands, 10 March
 Created a Knight of the Collar of the Spanish Order of Isabella the Catholic by King Juan Carlos in 1999. Members of the order at the rank of knight and above enjoy personal nobility and have the privilege of adding a golden heraldic mantle to their coats of arms. Those at the rank of the Collar also receive the official style of "His or Her Most Excellent Lord".
 Created Knight Grand Cross of the Royal Order of the Crown of Rwanda by King Kigeli V in 1999 (personal nobility, the official style "His Excellency").

2000
 Honorary Juris Doctor degree from the Faculty of Law at Uppsala University, Sweden, 22 January
 The Nelson Mandela National Museum is officially opened in Soweto, 11 February
 Awarded honorary Doctorate of Laws by Trinity College Dublin, 11 April
 Appointed honorary Queen's Counsel by Queen Elizabeth II, 3 May
 Awarded SABS Gold Medal, Sandton, 10 June
 BT Ethnic Multicultural Media Award, London, 29 June
 Received World Methodist Peace Award, London, 29 June
 International Freedom Award, Memphis, Tennessee, 22 November
 Elected an Honorary Member of the Bertrand Russell Society, 
 Awarded Honorary Doctorate of Law from the University of Technology, Sydney, Australia
 Awarded Honorary Doctor of Letters from the Australian National University, 6 September
 Awarded the Benjamin Franklin Medal for Distinguished Public Service by the American Philosophical Society
 Honorary Doctor Honoris Causa from the University of São Paulo.

2001
 International Gandhi Peace Prize, Presidential Palace, New Delhi, 16 March
 Made an Honorary Freeman of Leeds, 30 April
 Made an Honorary Fellow of Magdalene College, Cambridge, 2 May
 Awarded the first King Shaka Award in recognition of bravery, 25 July 2001
 Park Public School renamed Mandela Park Public School, Toronto, Ontario, Canada, 17 November
 Received honorary doctorate of law from Ryerson University, Toronto, Ontario, Canada, 17 November
 Granted Honorary Citizenship of Canada, 19 November
 Awarded the LLD Honoris Cause from the University of the Free State
 Awarded the D Tech Education Honoris Cause from the Technikon Free State
 Human Rights Lifetime Achievement award by the SA Human Rights Commission, Johannesburg, 11 December
 Made an Honorary Administrator For A Day at Binghamton University

2002
 Awarded an honorary doctorate in law from University of Hong Kong, Hong Kong, Hong Kong, 21 March
 Awarded an honorary doctorate in law from Rhodes University, Grahamstown, South Africa, 6 April
 New hall of residence at Rhodes University, Grahamstown, South Africa named 'Nelson Mandela Hall'
 Awarded an honorary doctorate by the University of Ghana, 24 April
 Awarded the Franklin Delano Roosevelt Freedom Medal, Middelburg, The Netherlands, 8 June.
 Awarded the Presidential Medal of Freedom, the United States' highest civilian award, by George W. Bush, Washington, USA, 9 July
 Awarded the Queen Elizabeth II Golden Jubilee Medal from Canada.
 Awarded the Order of Mapungubwe – Platinum Category by President Thabo Mbeki, Union Buildings, Pretoria, December 2002.
 Construction begins on Mandela Parkway in Oakland, California, replacing the Cypress Street Viaduct portion of the Nimitz Freeway that was demolished by 1989's Loma Prieta earthquake.

2003
 Awarded an honorary doctorate in law by the National University of Ireland, Galway, 20 June
 Elected an Honorary Life member of the Literary and Debating Society, NUI, Galway.
 Named a Hero of Freedom by the libertarian magazine Reason
 Awarded Honorary Doctorate Degree – Doctor of Letters (Honoris causa) by The Open University of Tanzania
 British Red Cross Humanity Medal

2004

 Sandton Square in Johannesburg, South Africa is renamed Nelson Mandela Square on 31 March with the unveiling of a 6-metre bronze statue.
 Listed as one of the 100 most influential people of 2004 by Time magazine
 Appointed Bailiff Grand Cross of the Most Venerable Order of St John of Jerusalem
 Africa Elephant Award by the Africa Scout Region
 Zoologists Brent E. Hendrixson and Jason E. Bond named a South African species of trapdoor spider in the family Ctenizidae as Stasimopus mandelai, "honouring Nelson Mandela, the former president of South Africa and one of the great moral leaders of our time."
 Presented with the Honorary Degree of Doctor of Laws from Open University. The award was presented to him at his home in Cape Town by Professor Brenda Gourley The Open University's Vice-Chancellor (2002–2008) and former Vice-Chancellor of the University of Natal.

2005
 Amherst College honorary degree.
 Listed as one of the 100 most influential people of 2005 by Time magazine

2006
 New Statesman – Listed as the number 2 in the 50 "Heroes of our time".
 Awarded Amnesty International's Ambassador of Conscience Award
 Made an honorary member of Manchester United as the club toured South Africa in the winter of 2006
 Conferred an honorary doctorate in government and politics by Universiti Teknologi Mara, the biggest public university in Malaysia, in recognition of his tireless efforts and triumph in struggling for the people's rights in his country and strengthening their socio-economy.
 Awarded the Giuseppe Motta Medal for support for peace and democracy.
 6 July 2006 Included in "Names on the Wall" monument to freedom fighters at Oriel Chambers, the home of the Wilberforce Institute for the study of Slavery and Emancipation, University of Hull, Hull, UK 
 South African Red Cross Society Humanitarian Award
 Conferred an honorary Doctorate of Humane Letters from the University of Massachusetts
 Awarded The Ahimsa Award by the Institute of Jainology, for his Gandhian principles of non-violence in Independence, UK

2007
 The Westminster City Council agreed to erect a statue of Mandela opposite the Houses of Parliament in London.
 Honorary citizen of Belgrade, Serbia. "for his huge humanitarian past and contributions to mankind".
 Received the Order of the Smile, Poland, 26 October.

2008
Michigan State University LLD honoris causa.
 Order of Stara Planina First Class, awarded by Bulgaria (12 June 2008)
 Received an honorary doctorate from Queen's University Belfast on 1 July 2008
 Received the Freedom of the City of Tshwane on 13 May 2008.

2009
 In July 2009, Mandela received the Arthur Ashe Courage Award, presented by Venus Williams and Serena Williams. Accepting on his behalf were his daughter and grandson.
 In November 2009, the United Nations General Assembly announced that Mandela's birthday, 18 July, is to be known as "Mandela Day" marking his contribution to world freedom.

2010
 Received Honorary Degree from Queen's University at Kingston in Ontario, Canada on 28 October.
 Conferred an Honorary Doctorate Degree by six universities in the Laureate International Universities network.
 Conferred an Honorary Doctor of Laws Degree by Brown University in Providence, Rhode Island, United States.
 Received Orden del Águila Azteca. Presented by President of México Felipe Calderón, Johannesburg, South Africa, 11 June 2010.

2012
 Received the Canadian version of the Queen Elizabeth II Diamond Jubilee Medal
 Received the Robben Island Alumnus Award in recognition of being a UNISA Robben Island Alumnus who has sacrificed so much for the liberation of South Africa.

2013
 On 10 December 2013, the amphitheatre of the Union Buildings in Pretoria was renamed the Nelson Mandela Amphitheatre.
 On 16 December 2013, a  bronze statue of Mandela was unveiled at the Union Buildings in Pretoria.

2014
 A plaque was dedicated in Monument Park at Yankee Stadium to commemorate his 1990 visit.

2015
 Nelson Mandela was posthumously inducted into the World Rugby Hall of Fame.

2016
A quote of Mandela's from 1991, "I cherish my own freedom dearly, but I care even more for your freedom," is on a wall of the Contemplative Court, a space for reflection in the Smithsonian's National Museum of African American History and Culture; the museum opened in 2016.

2018
On 24 September 2018, Heads  of  State  and  Government  and  representatives  of  States  and Governments, met  at  United  Nations  Headquarters  in  New  York, at the "Nelson Mandela Peace Summit" to reflect on global peace, in honour of the centenary of the birth of Nelson Mandela and to collectively hold themselves accountable to the values and principles of the  declaration drafted and agreed upon at the summit, to strive for a just, peaceful, prosperous, democratic, fair, equitable and inclusive world. The world leaders called upon their people to celebrate the richness of our diversity and the collective creativity and wisdom of our elders, and the well-being and survival of Mother Earth, and called upon their youth, artists, sports personalities, musicians and poets to breathe new life into the values and principles of the United Nations and recognize the period from 2019 to 2028 as the Nelson Mandela Decade of  Peace.

2019 to 2028 
The UN Nelson Mandela Decade of  Peace, an intergovernmental honour.

Summary of orders received

Coat of arms

References 

Mandela, Nelson
Nelson Mandela
Mandela